Giuseppe Pirovani (c. 1755-c. 1835) was an Italian painter of the Neoclassic period, mainly active in Brescia.

Born in Pavia to a Brescian family. His father was a merchant, who noticed his son's affinity to and ability at drawing while at work; he thus sent young Giuseppe to study in Rome under Pompeo Battoni. He apparently submitted designs for a public hall in Philadelphia. He painted altarpieces in Brescia.

References

1750s births
1830s deaths
18th-century Italian painters
Italian male painters
19th-century Italian painters
Painters from Brescia
19th-century Italian male artists
18th-century Italian male artists